Gregory Maguire (born June 9, 1954) is an American novelist. He is the author of Wicked: The Life and Times of the Wicked Witch of the West, Confessions of an Ugly Stepsister, and several dozen other novels for adults and children. Many of Maguire's adult novels are inspired by classic children's stories. Maguire published his first novel, The Lightning Time, in 1978. Wicked, published in 1995, was his first novel for adults. Though unsuccessful at first, it was adapted into a popular Broadway musical in 2003.

Maguire is married to American painter Andy Newman, in one of the first gay marriages performed in the state of Massachusetts. They have three children.

Biography
Born and raised in Albany, New York, Gregory Maguire is the youngest of four children born to Helen and John Maguire. His mother died from complications suffered giving birth to him, which prompted his father to send him to live with an aunt. His aunt relinquished him to a local orphanage when he was six months old. He was reclaimed from the orphanage at age two, after his father's remarriage. Maguire has three half-siblings from his father's second marriage.

Schooled in Catholic institutions through high school, he received a BA in English and art from the State University of New York at Albany, an MA in children's literature from Simmons College, and a PhD in English and American literature from Tufts University. His doctoral thesis was on children's fantasy written from 1938 to 1989.

In 1978, at the age of 25, Maguire published his first novel, The Lightning Time. Around the same time, he began to realize he was gay. He was a professor and co-director at the Simmons College Center for the Study of Children's Literature from 1979 to 1986. In 1987, Maguire co-founded a nonprofit educational charity, Children's Literature New England, Inc., and was co-director for twenty-five years. He has lived in Dublin, London, and the greater Boston area.

In 1995, Maguire published his first adult novel, Wicked: the Life and Times of the Wicked Witch of the West. Though the novel was initially unsuccessful, it sold 500,000 copies by the time the Broadway adaptation opened in 2003. In 2005, ten years after its publication, Wicked spent 26 weeks on the New York Times bestseller list.

Maguire met American painter Andy Newman in 1997 at the Blue Mountain Center art colony. Within a month of meeting, they had fallen in love. They adopted three children: Luke and Alex, originally from Cambodia, and Helen, originally from Guatemala. Maguire and Newman were married in June 2004, shortly after gay marriage became legal in Massachusetts. They have lived in Concord, Massachusetts since 1999. On April 13, 2009, Maguire and his family were featured on Oprah.

Bibliography

For children 
The Lightning Time (1978)
The Daughter of the Moon (1980)
Lights on the Lake (1981)
The Dream Stealer (1983)
The Peace and Quiet Diner (1988)
I Feel like the Morning Star (1989)
Lucas Fishbone (1990)
Missing Sisters  (1994)
Oasis (1996)
The Good Liar (1997)
Crabby Cratchitt (2000)
Leaping Beauty: And Other Animal Fairy Tales (2004)
The Hamlet Chronicles:
Seven Spiders Spinning (1994) 
Six Haunted Hairdos (1997)
Five Alien Elves (1998)
Four Stupid Cupids (2000)
Three Rotten Eggs (2002)
A Couple of April Fools (2004)
One Final Firecracker (2005)
What-the-Dickens: The Story of a Rogue Tooth Fairy (2007)
Missing Sisters (2009)
Egg and Spoon (2014)
Cress Watercress (2022)

For adults
 The Wicked Years:
Wicked: The Life and Times of the Wicked Witch of the West (1995)
Son of a Witch (2005)
A Lion Among Men (2008)
Out of Oz (2011)
Confessions of an Ugly Stepsister (1999)
Lost (2001)
Mirror, Mirror (2003)
The Next Queen of Heaven (2010)
Tales Told in Oz (2012)
After Alice (2015)
Hiddensee: A Tale of the Once and Future Nutcracker (2017)
A Wild Winter Swan (2020)
Another Day:
The Brides of Maracoor (2021)
The Oracle of Maracoor (2022) 
The Witch of Maracoor (2023)

Short stories
Scarecrow (2001), published in Half-Human edited by Bruce Coville (Note: This is the life story of the Scarecrow from The Wonderful Wizard of Oz, but is not a part of The Wicked Years.)
Fee, Fie, Foe et Cetera (2002), published in The Green Man: Tales from the Mythic Forest
The Oakthing (2004), published in The Faery Reel: Tales from the Twilight Realm
Chatterbox, published in I Believe in Water: Twelve Brushes With Religion
The Honorary Shepherds (1994), published in Am I Blue?:Coming Out From The Silence
Beyond the Fringe (1998) published in A Glory of Unicorns
The Seven Stage a Comeback (2000) published in A Wolf at the Door and Other Retold Fairy Tales
Matchless: A Christmas Story (2009)
The Silk Road Runs Through Tupperneck, N.H. (2009), published in How Beautiful the Ordinary: Twelve Stories of Identity
In That Country (2012), published in Parnassus Literary Arts Magazine

Non-fiction
Innocence and Experience: Essays and Conversations on Children's Literature (ed., with Barbara Harrison) (1987)
Origins of Story: On Writing for Children (ed., with Barbara Harrison) (1999)
Making Mischief: A Maurice Sendak Appreciation (2009)

References

External links
  
 
 
 Biography at the National Children's Book and Literacy Alliance (archived 2006-10-04)
 Interview at NCBLA (archived 2006-10-04)
 Gregory Maguire at publisher HarperCollins (archived 2009-07-27)
 "American Fairy Tales: A Conversation with Gregory Maguire" (2010) at The Daily Ozmapolitan (frodelius.com)

1954 births
Living people
20th-century American novelists
21st-century American novelists
American children's writers
American fantasy writers
American male novelists
American gay writers
Writers from Albany, New York
Simmons University faculty
University at Albany, SUNY alumni
Tufts University School of Arts and Sciences alumni
American LGBT novelists
LGBT people from New York (state)
American male short story writers
American Roman Catholics
LGBT Roman Catholics
Christian writers
20th-century American short story writers
21st-century American short story writers
20th-century American male writers
21st-century American male writers
Novelists from Massachusetts
Novelists from New York (state)